Bonzo may mean:

 Nickname of John Bonham, the drummer for Led Zeppelin
 Bonzo the dog, a fictional character that was created by British commercial artist George E. Studdy
 A chimpanzee - the title character in the 1951 comedy film Bedtime for Bonzo, also starring Ronald Reagan
 A nickname for Ronald Reagan, based on the film and mentioned in a number of songs:
 "Five Minutes" (Bonzo Goes to Washington song) by the band Bonzo Goes to Washington, which refers to a microphone test speech made by Reagan
 "My Brain Is Hanging Upside Down (Bonzo Goes to Bitburg)" by The Ramones
 "Bad Time for Bonzo" by The Damned (band)
 Bonzo Dog Band, sometimes referred to as The Bonzos
 Bonzo Madrid, a character in the Ender series
 Uncle Bonzo, a menacing figure from Puccini's Madama Butterfly
 Bonzo (Piedmont), a former municipality in Piedmont, Italy